Master's College of Theology (MCT) is an ecumenical theological seminary located in Visakhapatnam in Andhra Pradesh, India. It is a ministry of Vision Nationals, founded in 1996.

Since 2003, MCT has been affiliated to the Senate of Serampore College. Along with Bethel Bible College, Guntur, MCT is one of two seminaries in the Andhra region to offer university-recognised graduate-level courses in theology.

Motto
MCT's motto is "To equip the Nationals as Godly and Dynamic Leaders to serve as Stewards, Scholars, Teachers, Pastors and Evangelists to the Church at large with reference to the great commission." It is drawn from the Great Commission in Matthew 28:18-20.

College life
MCT offers the degree of Bachelor of Divinity (B.D.), B.Th,(internal) M.Div, B.C.S., Dip.Th. (external). A usual day begins from 8am with worship in the chapel.  Once a week fasting prayers are performed.

Faculty
 Missions - Rev. Dr. K. David Udayakumar
 Old Testament -   Mr. R. Satish Karun
 New Testament -  Rev. Devakrupa Varakumar
 Theology -       Rev. John Peter Paul
 Religions -      Mr. Seiminchon Chongloi.
 History of Christianity - Rev. P. S. Chitti Babu
 Counselling - Rev. Leela Grace
 English - Mr. R. Eluzai.

References

Christian seminaries and theological colleges in India
Seminaries and theological colleges in India
Educational institutions established in 1996
Universities and colleges in Visakhapatnam
1996 establishments in Andhra Pradesh
Seminaries and theological colleges affiliated to the Senate of Serampore College (University)